PNC Park is a baseball stadium on the North Shore of Pittsburgh, Pennsylvania. It is the fifth home of the Pittsburgh Pirates of Major League Baseball (MLB). It was opened during the 2001 MLB season, after the controlled implosion of the Pirates' previous home, Three Rivers Stadium. PNC Park stands just east of its predecessor along the Allegheny River with a view of the Downtown Pittsburgh skyline. Constructed of steel and limestone, PNC Park has a natural grass playing surface and can seat 38,747 people for baseball.

Plans to build a new stadium for the Pirates originated in 1991 but did not come to fruition for five years. Funded in conjunction with Acrisure Stadium and the David L. Lawrence Convention Center, the park was built for $216 million in 24 months, faster than most modern stadiums. Built in the "retro-classic" style modeled after past venues like Pittsburgh's Forbes Field, PNC Park also introduced unique features, such as the use of limestone in the building's facade. The park has a riverside concourse, steel truss work, an extensive out-of-town scoreboard, and local eateries. Several tributes to former Pirate Roberto Clemente are incorporated into the ballpark, and the nearby Sixth Street Bridge was renamed in his honor. In addition to the Pirates' regular-season and postseason home games, PNC Park has hosted other events, including the 2006 Major League Baseball All-Star Game and numerous concerts.

PNC Financial Services originally purchased the naming rights in 1998 for $30 million over 20 years, and currently holds the rights through 2031.

Several writers have called PNC Park one of the best baseball stadiums in America, citing its location, views of the Pittsburgh skyline and Allegheny River, timeless design, and clear angles of the field from every seat.

History

Planning and funding
On September 5, 1991, Pittsburgh mayor Sophie Masloff proposed a new 44,000-seat stadium for the Pittsburgh Pirates on the city's North Side. Three Rivers Stadium, the Pirates' and Steelers' home at the time, had been designed for functionality rather than "architecture and aesthetics". As well, its location made it hard to reach from much of the city, with traffic congestion before and after games. Discussions about a new ballpark took place, but were never seriously considered until entrepreneur Kevin McClatchy purchased the team in February 1996. Until McClatchy's purchase, plans about the team remaining in Pittsburgh were uncertain. In 1996, Masloff's successor, Tom Murphy, created the "Forbes Field II Task Force". Made up of 29 political and business leaders, the team studied the challenges of constructing a new ballpark. Their final report, published on June 26, 1996, evaluated 13 possible locations. The "North Side site" was recommended due to its affordable cost, potential to develop the surrounding area, and opportunity to incorporate the city skyline into the stadium's design. The site selected for the ballpark is just upriver from the site of early Pirates home field Exposition Park.

After a political debate, public money was used to fund PNC Park. Originally, a sales tax increase was proposed to fund three projects: PNC Park, Heinz Field (home of the Steelers, now called Acrisure Stadium), and an expansion of the David L. Lawrence Convention Center. That proposal was soundly rejected in a 1997 referendum known as the Regional Renaissance Initiative. 

The city then developed Plan B, which proved similarly controversial. It was labeled Scam B by opponents who said it would consume too much public money; one member of the Allegheny Regional Asset District board called the use of tax dollars "corporate welfare" while others said the Pirates should contribute more than their pledged $40 million. Still, the board approved Plan B on July 9, 1998; it included $228 million for PNC Park in a total package of $809 million. Shortly thereafter, the Pirates made a deal with Pittsburgh city officials to remain in the city until at least 2031.

There was popular sentiment by fans for the Pirates to name the stadium after former outfielder Roberto Clemente. However, locally based PNC Financial Services purchased the stadium's naming rights in August 1998. Under the agreement, PNC Bank paid the Pirates about $2 million each year through 2020; it also maintains a full-service PNC branch at the stadium. The total cost of PNC Park was $216 million. Shortly after the naming rights deal was announced, the city of Pittsburgh renamed the 6th Street Bridge near the southeast corner of the site of the park the Roberto Clemente Bridge as a compromise to fans who had wanted the park named after Clemente.

Design and construction
Kansas City-based Populous (then HOK Sport), which designed many other major league ballparks of the late 20th and early 21st century, designed the ballpark. The design and construction management team consisted of the Dick Corporation and Barton Malow. An effort was made in the design of PNC Park to salute other "classic style" ballparks, such as Fenway Park, Wrigley Field, and Pittsburgh's Forbes Field; the design of the ballpark's archways, steel truss work, and light standards are results of this goal. PNC Park was the first two-deck ballpark to be built in the United States since Milwaukee County Stadium opened in 1953. The park features a 24 by 42 foot (7.3 by 12.8 m) Sony JumboTron, which is accompanied by the first-ever LED video boards in an outdoor MLB stadium. PNC Park is the first stadium to feature an out-of-town scoreboard with the score, inning, number of outs, and base runners for every other game being played around the league.  The out-of-town scoreboard was disabled for the 2022 season and replaced with advertising.

Ground was broken for PNC Park on April 7, 1999, after a ceremony to christen the newly renamed Roberto Clemente Bridge. As part of original plans to create an enjoyable experience for fans, the bridge is closed to vehicular traffic on game days to allow spectators to park in Pittsburgh's Golden Triangle and walk across the bridge to the stadium. PNC Park was built with Kasota limestone shipped from a Minnesota river valley, to contrast the brick bases of other modern stadiums. The American-made raw steel for the ballpark was fabricated in Brownsville, Pennsylvania by Wilhelm and Krus. The stadium was constructed over a 24-month span—at the time of construction, three months faster than any other modern major league ballpark—and the Pirates played their first game less than two years after groundbreaking. The quick construction was accomplished with the use of special computers, which relayed building plans to builders 24 hours per day. In addition, all 23 labor unions involved in the construction signed a pact that they would not strike during the building process. As a result of union involvement and attention to safety regulations, the construction manager, the Dick Corporation, received a merit award for its safety practices from the Occupational Safety and Health Administration.

Statues of Pirates' Hall of Famers Honus Wagner, Roberto Clemente, Willie Stargell and Bill Mazeroski are positioned at various points outside of PNC Park. Wagner and Clemente's statues were previously located outside of Three Rivers Stadium, and after the venue was imploded, the two statues were removed from their locations, refurbished, and relocated outside PNC Park. Wagner's statue was originally unveiled at Forbes Field in 1955. The base of Clemente's statue is shaped like a baseball diamond, with dirt from three of the fields Clemente played at—Santurce Field in Carolina, Puerto Rico, Forbes Field, and Three Rivers Stadium—at each base. On October 1, 2000, after the final game at Three Rivers Stadium, Stargell threw out the ceremonial last pitch. He was presented with a model of a statue that was to be erected in his honor outside of PNC Park. The statue was officially unveiled on April 7, 2001; however, Stargell did not attend due to health problems and died of a stroke two days later. A statue for Bill Mazeroski was added at the right field entrance, at the south end of Mazeroski Way, during the 2010 season. This was the 50th anniversary of the Pirates' 1960 World Series championship, which Mazeroski clinched with a Game 7 walk-off home run at Forbes Field. The statue itself was designed based on that event.

Opening and reception

The Pirates opened PNC Park with two exhibition games against the New York Mets—the first of which was played on March 31, 2001. The first official baseball game played in PNC Park was between the Cincinnati Reds and the Pirates, on April 9, 2001. The Reds won the game by the final score of 8–2. The first pitch—a ball—was thrown from Pittsburgh's Todd Ritchie to Barry Larkin. In the top of the first inning, Pittsburgh native Sean Casey's two-run home run was the first hit in the park. The first Pirates' batter, Adrian Brown, struck out; however, later in the inning Jason Kendall singled—the first hit by a Pirate in their new stadium.

PNC Park had an average attendance of 30,742 people per game throughout its inaugural season, though it would drop approximately 27% the following season to 22,594 spectators per game. Throughout the 2001 season, businesses in downtown and on the Northside of Pittsburgh showed a 20–25% increase in business on Pirate game days.

Pirates' vice-president Steve Greenberg said, "We said when construction began that we would build the best ballpark in baseball, and we believe we've done that." Major League Baseball executive Paul Beeston said the park was "the best he's seen so far in baseball". Many of the workers who built the park said that it was the nicest that they had seen. Jason Kendall, Pittsburgh's catcher at the opening of the park, called PNC Park "the most beautiful ballpark in the game". Different elements of PNC Park were used in the design of New York's Citi Field.

Upon opening in 2001, PNC Park was praised by fans and media alike. ESPN.com writer Jim Caple ranked PNC Park as the best stadium in Major League Baseball, with a score of 95 out of 100. Caple compared the park to Frank Lloyd Wright's Fallingwater, calling the stadium itself "perfect", and citing high ticket prices as the only negative aspect of visiting the park. Jay Ahjua, author of Fields of Dreams: A Guide to Visiting and Enjoying All 30 Major League Ballparks, called PNC Park one of the "top ten places to watch the game". Eric Enders, author of Ballparks Then and Now and co-author of Big League Ballparks: The Complete Illustrated History, said it was "everything a baseball stadium could hope to be" and "an immediate contender for the title of best baseball park ever built". In 2008, Men's Fitness named the park one of "10 big league parks worth seeing this summer". A 2010 unranked list of "America's 7 Best Ballparks" published by ABC News noted that PNC Park "combines the best features of yesterday's ballparks—rhythmic archways, steel trusswork and a natural grass playing field—with the latest in fan and player amenities and comfort". In 2017, a panel of Washington Post sports writers ranked it the 2nd-best stadium in MLB. A 2018 article in Parade dubbed PNC Park "The Jewel of the Allegheny".

Alterations
An exhibit honoring Pittsburgh's Negro league baseball teams was introduced in 2006. Located by the stadium's left-field entrance, the display features statues of seven players who competed for the city's Homestead Grays and Pittsburgh Crawfords, including Josh Gibson and Satchel Paige. The exhibit also includes the Legacy Theatre, a 25-seat facility that plays a film about Pittsburgh's history with the Negro leagues. The Pirates donated the statues to the Josh Gibson Foundation in 2015.

In 2007, Allegheny County passed a ban on smoking in most public places, thus making PNC Park completely smoke-free. Before the 2008 season, the Pirates made multiple alterations to PNC Park. The biggest change was removing the Outback Steakhouse located in the left field stands, and adding a new restaurant known as The Hall of Fame Club. Unlike its predecessor, The Hall of Fame Club is open to all ticket-holders on game days; it includes an outdoor patio with a bar and seats with a view of the field. The Pirates feature bands in The Hall of Fame Club after the completion of select games—the first performance was by Joe Grushecky and the Houserockers. The Pirates also announced a program to make the park more environmentally friendly, by integrating "greening initiatives, sustainable business practices and educational outreach". In addition, club and suite sections were outfitted with new televisions.

In 2012, the "Budweiser Bow Tie," a  bar and lounge located in the right-field corner of the ballpark, was added. The section includes ticketed seats as well as areas for groups and the general public. This addition was expected to cost about $1 million. 

Improvements made for the 2015 season include the left-field terrace between the left-field bleachers and the Rivertowne Brewing Hall of Fame Club. Its two levels for standing room, including  of drink rails, are open to any fan with a ticket. Added next to the terraces was "The Porch", a patio that overlooks the center field and has bar tables and outdoor sofa-style seating and accommodates groups of 25 people. Other 2015 additions include The Corner, a bar at the base of the left-field rotunda with nine flat-screen TVs; Terrace Bar, a bar in the upper concourse; and Pirates Outfitters, a merchandise shop next to the home-plate entrance. The Pirates paid all costs for the additions to the park. 

Before the 2017 season, the manual out-of-town scoreboard on the right-field wall was replaced by an LED screen. 

Improvements for the 2022 season included the replacement of several rows of seats in center field and the security booth located next to the batter's eye by two open-air bars, where fans can watch the game while ordering drinks. A pirate-ship-themed playground for kids was added in this area, along with signs and plaques detailing the club's history and five championships. Outside the park, the Pirates added a display near the Center Field entrance commemorating the team's retired numbers, and large baseballs along the Allegheny River bearing the names of Pittsburgh-based members of the Baseball Hall of Fame, including players from the local Negro league franchises, the Homestead Grays and Pittsburgh Crawfords. In September 2022, the Pirates unveiled their own Hall of Fame, located in the Legacy Square area of the ballpark near the left field rotunda. The inaugural class featured 15 members. 

Ahead of the 2023 season, the Pirates replaced and expanded the main scoreboard.

Notable events

Baseball

PNC Park hosted the 77th Major League Baseball All-Star Game on July 11, 2006. The American League defeated the National League 3–2, with 38,904 spectators in attendance. The first All-Star Game in PNC Park, it was the 5th All-Star Game hosted in Pittsburgh, and the first since 1994. During the game, late Pirate Roberto Clemente was honored with the Commissioner's Historic Achievement Award; his wife, Vera, accepted on his behalf. The stadium hosted the Home Run Derby the previous evening; Ryan Howard, of the Philadelphia Phillies, won the title. During the Derby, Howard and David Ortiz hit home runs into the Allegheny River.

On September 28, 2012, PNC Park saw its first no-hitter when Reds pitcher Homer Bailey no-hit the Pirates, 1–0. PNC Park has yet to see a no-hitter or perfect game thrown by a Pirate.

On October 1, 2013, the Pirates hosted the Cincinnati Reds in the 2013 National League Wild Card Game. This marked the first time a playoff game was played at PNC Park. The Pirates won 6–2, their first postseason victory since 1992, in front of a record crowd of 40,629. The 2014 and 2015 National League Wild Card games were also played at PNC Park.

On July 20, 2020, it was reported that the Pirates were exploring offering use of PNC Park as a temporary home stadium for the Toronto Blue Jays for the 2020 MLB season, as the team was unable to obtain clearance from the Canadian government to play at Rogers Centre under travel restrictions issued because of the COVID-19 pandemic. The team's current GM Ben Cherington previously worked for the Blue Jays before being hired by the Pirates. On July 22, 2020, the Toronto Blue Jays were denied permission to play home games at PNC Park by the Pennsylvania Department of Health Secretary Dr. Rachel Levine and Pennsylvania Governor Tom Wolf.

College baseball
The first collegiate baseball game at PNC Park was played on May 6, 2003, between the Pitt Panthers and the Duquesne Dukes, who won 2–1. Dubbed the City Game, it was played annually (except in 2007, when the game was canceled because of poor field conditions) through 2010, at which point Pitt had won four games and Duquesne two. Duquesne disbanded their baseball program after the 2010 season.

Concerts
PNC Park has hosted various concerts, including Bruce Springsteen & The E Street Band, Styx, Jason Aldean, Billy Joel, The Rolling Stones, Pearl Jam, Jimmy Buffett, Me First and the Gimme Gimmes, Dave Matthews Band, Ed Sheeran, Zac Brown Band, Green Day, Fall Out Boy, Weezer, Metallica, Def Leppard and Mötley Crüe.

In film
The park served as a location for the films She's Out of My League (2010), Abduction (2011), Jack Reacher (2012) and Sweet Girl (2021).

Other events
PNC Park has hosted drills to practice evacuation and other responses to a terrorist attack. Members of the United States Department of Homeland Security laid out the groundwork for the initial drill in February 2004. In May 2005, 5,000 volunteers participated in the $1 million evacuation drill, which included mock explosions. A goal of the drill was to test the response of 49 western Pennsylvania emergency agencies. In April 2006, the Department of Homeland Security worked with the United States Coast Guard to develop a plan of response for the 2006 All-Star Game. Similar exercises were conducted on the Allegheny River in 2007.

Special features

Playing surface and dimensions

The playing surface of PNC Park is Tuckahoe Bluegrass, which is a mixture of various types of Kentucky Bluegrass. Installed before the 2009 season, the grass surface was selected for its "high-quality pedigree that is ideal for Northern cities such as Pittsburgh". The infield dirt is a mixture known as "Dura Edge Custom Pro Infield Mix" and was designed solely for PNC Park. The  warning track is crushed lava rock. The drainage system underneath the field is capable of handling  of rain per hour. The original playing surface consisted of sand-based natural grass, and was replaced before the 2006 season. The playing surface also underwent a significant renovation following the 2016 season. The 2016 renovation included excavation of the top  of rootzone soil, importing of rootzone material with improved physical properties, deep tillage, laser grading, and installation of new Kentucky bluegrass sod. Unlike most ballparks, PNC Park's home dugout is located along the third base line instead of the first base line; giving the home team a view of the city skyline. On July 6, 2002, Daryle Ward became the first player to hit the river "on the fly". On June 2, 2013, Garrett Jones became only the second player to accomplish the feat, and was the first Pirate to do so. On May 19, 2015, Pirates first baseman Pedro Alvarez became the third person to do this, although the ball actually landed in a boat on the river rather than in the water. The longest home run in PNC Park history was  hit to left-center field by Sammy Sosa on April 12, 2002.

Seating, attendance, and ticket prices
During its opening season, PNC Park's seating capacity of 38,496 was the second-smallest of any major league stadium (the smallest being Fenway Park). Seats are angled toward the field and aisles are lowered to give spectators improved views of the field. At , the batter is closer to the seats behind home plate than to the pitcher. The four-level steel rotunda and a section above the out-of-town scoreboard offer standing-room-only space. With the exception of the bleacher sections, all seats in the park offer a view of Pittsburgh's skyline.

In its opening season, PNC Park's tickets were priced between $9 and $35 for general admission. One of only two teams not to increase ticket prices entering the 2009 season, PNC Park ranked as having the third-cheapest average ticket prices in the league in 2009. Despite price increases in the 2015 season, the average ticket price at PNC Park remained in the bottom five among MLB teams. The stadium's average ticket price held between $15 and $17 from 2006 to 2013 (among the lowest in Major League Baseball), then rose to $18.32 in 2014, $19.99 in 2015, and $29.96 in 2016.

In the stadium's first decade, average attendance dipped under 20,000 fans per game four times. Before 2013, the Pirates had only one winning record since 1992. Through 2004, 5% of games played at PNC Park were sold out. The number of sellouts increased in 2012 and 2013; after filling PNC Park 17 times in 2012, the team played to capacity crowds at 23 games in 2013. In 2014, average attendance crossed the 30,000 mark for the first time since PNC Park's inaugural season in 2001, and remained above 30,000 in 2015 before dropping to 27,000 in 2016.

Eateries

The main eating concourse, known as "Tastes of Pittsburgh", features a wide range of options including traditional ballpark foods, hometown specialties, and more exotic fare like sushi. Pittsburgh's hometown specialties include Primanti Brothers sandwiches, whose signature item consists of meat, cheese, hand-cut French fries, tomatoes, and coleslaw between two slices of Italian bread. Other local eateries offered include Mrs. T's Pierogies, Quaker Steak & Lube, Augustine's Pizza, and Benkovitz Seafood. Located behind center field seating is Manny's BBQ, which offers various barbecue meals. It is named for former Pirates' catcher Manny Sanguillén, who has been known to sign autographs for fans waiting in line. For the 2008 season, the Pirates created an all-you-can-eat section in the right field corner. Fans seated in the section are allowed "unlimited hot dogs, hamburgers, nachos, salads, popcorn, peanuts, ice cream and pop" for an entire game. In addition to the food offered, fans are free to bring their own food into the stadium, a rarity among the league's ballparks.

For its first 13 years, PNC Park sold Pepsi products, a contrast from its predecessor Three Rivers Stadium, which sold Coca-Cola products, as well as Heinz Field and Mellon Arena. In right field, several versions of the Pepsi Globe as well as a Pepsi bottle were displayed on large posts behind the stands and lit up every time the Pirates hit a home run. In 2014, the Pirates switched to Coca-Cola. The Pepsi signage in right field was converted into advertising for locally based health insurance company Highmark.

In 2016, PNC Park made news with their introduction of the "Cracker Jack & Mac Dog". The foot-long all-beef hot dog was topped with macaroni and cheese, salted caramel sauce, deep-fried pickled jalapenos and a side of caramel-covered popcorn. Instead of a bun, naan bread was used to hold everything together.

Contractors
As with its predecessor, PNC Park's concessions service provider is Aramark, while the premium seating areas (The Lexus Club, PBC Level and Suites Level) are serviced by Levy Restaurants. In 2019, The Lexus Club was replaced by the Hyundai Club and Aramark took over food service.

Public address announcers
From its opening until 2021, Tim DeBacco served as PNC Park’s public address announcer. He is famous for his opening “Good evening, ladies and gentlemen, boys and girls and welcome to PNC Park.” and signing off “Thank you, and good night.”  After his semi-retirement in 2022, various Pittsburgh personalities including Guy Junker, Larry Richert, and Dave Cawley  served as guest announcers. Joe Klimchak and Debbie Bender serve as the on-field announcers.

Transportation access
PNC Park is located at exit 1B of Interstate 279 and within  of both Interstate 376 and Interstate 579.  The park is also served by the North Side transit station of the Pittsburgh subway system.

Climate

References
Footnotes

Bibliography

External links

 Stadium site on MLB.com

Sports venues completed in 2001
Major League Baseball venues
Sports venues in Pittsburgh
Pittsburgh Pirates stadiums
Baseball venues in Pennsylvania
Populous (company) buildings